Moraea collina is a species of the genus Moraea, in the family Iridaceae. It was formerly known as Homeria collina.

Distribution
The plant is endemic to the Western Cape, from Baines Kloof to Caledon. It is common on lower slopes and flats of Fynbos habitats.

Description

It has a simple or branched stem and a single sheath shaped leaf. The plant is not sticky to the touch.

Flowers are yellow (or pale salmon pink) with yellow nectar guides. The outer tepals form a cup. It flowers from July to September, with flowers opening in the afternoon.

Conservation
Moraea collina is listed as a plant species of Least Concern on the National Red List of South African plants.

References
Terry Trinder Smith & Mary Matham Kidd and Fay Anderson: Wild Flowers of the Table Mountain National Park: South African Wild Flower Guide 12 Botanical Society of South Africa 2006. 

collina
Endemic flora of South Africa
Flora of the Cape Provinces
Fynbos
Least concern plants
Least concern biota of Africa
IUCN Red List least concern species